Tweedles is a concept album by American art rock band The Residents. It was released on October 31, 2006. 
The CD is accompanied by a two-part book: the first half consists of the album's spoken lines, and the second half contains the lyrics of the songs.

It was recorded in 2006 when the Residents were invited by a friend in Romania to try out his new recording studios. As The Residents' own studio was undergoing maintenance to make it earthquake-resistant and could not be used for a year, they took the opportunity to record a new album.

Concept
Tweedles tells the story of an "emotional vampire" from a first person perspective.  He draws power from his well-developed ability to manipulate both men and women into seeing him as their perfect lover, at which point he uses that affection in order to secure sexual favors before moving onto his next victim, leaving confusion and pain in his wake while feeling nothing.  The character is shown contemplating his internal conflicts, lack of empathy, and romantic idealism, which he deems "disgusting".  Toward the end of the album it is revealed that Tweedles is the name of a clown alter-ego the narrator would have created if he had succeeded in becoming an entertainer.

Track listing

Tabasco 

On January 1, 2010, The Residents released 'Tabasco', a collection of 3 instrumental demo tracks which would ultimately evolve into Tweedles. The album was sold through their digital download store, 'Ralph Sells Downloads'. On May 15, 2015, following the shut down of RSD, the album was re-released through the Ralphlet Outlet bandcamp page for a limited time. The second version features new artwork.

All three tracks are named after the classical elements. 'Air' features early versions of 'Dreams', 'Life', 'Isolation' & 'Mark Of The Male'. 'Earth' features 'Stop Signs', 'Almost Perfect', 'Elevation', & 'Keep Talking'. 'Water' features 'Brown Cow' 'Dreams' 'Shame On Me' 'Ugly' & 'Susie Smiles'.

Track listing

Credits 

 Composed & Performed By The Residents
 With Guests: Carla Fabrizio, Nolan Cook, Gerri Lawlor & The Film Orchestra of Bucharest
 Recorded By: The Artists & Kevin Ink, 2006
 Published By: Pale Pachyderm Publishing, BMI / Warner Chappell, BMI
 Project Manager for Mute: Robert Schilling
 Thanks To: Olivier Cormier Otano
 Produced By: The Cryptic Corporation

References

The Residents albums
2006 albums
Mute Records albums
Concept albums